In physics, charge conservation is the principle that the total electric charge in an isolated system never changes.  The net quantity of electric charge, the amount of positive charge minus the amount of negative charge in the universe, is always conserved.   Charge conservation, considered as a physical conservation law, implies that the change in the amount of electric charge in any volume of space is exactly equal to the amount of charge flowing into the volume minus the amount of charge flowing out of the volume.  In essence, charge conservation is an accounting relationship between the amount of charge in a region and the flow of charge into and out of that region, given by a continuity equation between charge density  and current density .

This does not mean that individual positive and negative charges cannot be created or destroyed.  Electric charge is carried by subatomic particles such as electrons and protons. Charged particles can be created and destroyed in elementary particle reactions.  In particle physics, charge conservation means that in reactions that create charged particles, equal numbers of positive and negative particles are always created, keeping the net amount of charge unchanged. Similarly, when particles are destroyed, equal numbers of positive and negative charges are destroyed. This property is supported without exception by all empirical observations so far.

Although conservation of charge requires that the total quantity of charge in the universe is constant, it leaves open the question of what that quantity is.  Most evidence indicates that the net charge in the universe is zero; that is, there are equal quantities of positive and negative charge.

History
Charge conservation was first proposed by British scientist William Watson in 1746 and American statesman and scientist Benjamin Franklin in 1747, although the first convincing proof was given by Michael Faraday in 1843.

Formal statement of the law

Mathematically, we can state the law of charge conservation as a continuity equation:

The integrated continuity equation between two time values reads:

The general solution is obtained by fixing the initial condition time , leading to the integral equation:

The condition  corresponds to the absence of charge quantity change in the control volume: the system has reached a steady state. From the above condition, the following must hold true:

This deduction could be derived directly from the continuity equation, since at steady state  holds, and implies .

In electromagnetic field theory, vector calculus can be used to express the law in terms of charge density  (in coulombs per cubic meter) and electric current density  (in amperes per square meter). This is called the charge density continuity equation

The term on the left is the rate of change of the charge density  at a point. The term on the right is the divergence of the current density  at the same point. The equation equates these two factors, which says that the only way for the charge density at a point to change is for a current of charge to flow into or out of the point. This statement is equivalent to a conservation of four-current.

Mathematical derivation
The net current into a volume is

Here {{math|J}} is the current density (charge per unit area per unit time) at the surface of the volume. The vector points in the direction of the current.

From the Divergence theorem this can be written

Charge conservation requires that the net current into a volume must necessarily equal the net change in charge within the volume.

The total charge q in volume V is the integral (sum) of the charge density in V''

So, by the Leibniz integral rule

Equating and  gives

Since this is true for every volume, we have in general

Connection to gauge invariance
Charge conservation can also be understood as a consequence of symmetry through Noether's theorem, a central result in theoretical physics that asserts that each conservation law is associated with a symmetry of the underlying physics.  The symmetry that is associated with charge conservation is the global gauge invariance of the electromagnetic field.  This is related to the fact that the electric and magnetic fields are not changed by different choices of the value representing the zero point of electrostatic potential .  However the full symmetry is more complicated, and also involves the vector potential .   The full statement of gauge invariance is that the physics of an electromagnetic field are unchanged when the scalar and vector potential are shifted by the gradient of an arbitrary scalar field :

In quantum mechanics the scalar field is equivalent to a phase shift in the wavefunction of the charged particle:

so gauge invariance is equivalent to the well known fact that changes in the phase of a wavefunction are unobservable, and only changes in the magnitude of the wavefunction result in changes to the probability function .  This is the ultimate theoretical origin of charge conservation.

Gauge invariance is a very important, well established property of the electromagnetic field and has many testable consequences.  The theoretical justification for charge conservation is greatly strengthened by being linked to this symmetry.  For example, gauge invariance also requires that the photon be massless, so the good experimental evidence that the photon has zero mass is also strong evidence that charge is conserved.

Even if gauge symmetry is exact, however, there might be apparent electric charge non-conservation if charge could leak from our normal 3-dimensional space into hidden extra dimensions.

Experimental evidence
Simple arguments rule out some types of charge nonconservation.  For example, the magnitude of the elementary charge on positive and negative particles must be extremely close to equal, differing by no more than a factor of 10−21 for the case of protons and electrons.  Ordinary matter contains equal numbers of positive and negative particles, protons and electrons, in enormous quantities.  If the elementary charge on the electron and proton were even slightly different, all matter would have a large electric charge and would be mutually repulsive.

The best experimental tests of electric charge conservation are searches for particle decays that would be allowed if electric charge is not always conserved.  No such decays have ever been seen.
The best experimental test comes from searches for the energetic photon from an electron decaying into a neutrino and a single photon:

but there are theoretical arguments that such single-photon decays will never occur even if charge is not conserved. 
Charge disappearance tests are sensitive to decays without energetic photons, other unusual charge violating processes such as an electron spontaneously changing into a positron, 
and to electric charge moving into other dimensions.
The best experimental bounds on charge disappearance are:

See also

 Capacitance
 Charge invariance
 Conservation Laws and Symmetry
 Introduction to gauge theory – includes further discussion of gauge invariance and charge conservation
 Kirchhoff's circuit laws – application of charge conservation to electric circuits
 Maxwell's equations
 Relative charge density
 Franklin's electrostatic machine

Notes

Further reading

Electromagnetism
Conservation laws